Micranthes palmeri, commonly called Palmer's saxifrage, is a species of plant in the saxifrage family that is native to Oklahoma and Arkansas in the United States.

References

palmeri
Flora of North America